Ibn Sina Medical College (ISMC) is a private medical school in Bangladesh, established in 2005. It is located in the Kallyanpur area of Mirpur Model Thana, in Dhaka. It is affiliated with University of Dhaka as a constituent college.

It offers a five-year course of study leading to a Bachelor of Medicine, Bachelor of Surgery (MBBS) degree. A one-year internship after graduation is compulsory for  all graduates. The degree is recognised by the Bangladesh Medical and Dental Council.

The college's 14-story building also houses a teaching hospital with 250 beds. Construction is underway on a second, 16-story hospital on campus that will add 500 beds. Bangladesh Journal of Medical Science is the official journal of the college.

History
Ibn Sina Medical College is a non-profit institution of Ibn Sina Trust, named after Ibn Sina, a Persian philosopher, physician and medical scientist.

Campus
The college is located in the Kallyanpur area of Mirpur Model Thana, in Dhaka. The college's 14-story building also houses a teaching hospital with 250 beds. Construction is underway on a second, 16-story hospital on campus that will add 500 beds.

Organization and administration
The college is affiliated with University of Dhaka as a constituent college. The principal is A. N. M. Zia-Ur Rahman.

List of Principals of Ibn Sina Medical College

Academics 
The college offers a five-year course of study, approved by the Bangladesh Medical and Dental Council (BMDC), leading to a Bachelor of Medicine, Bachelor of Surgery (MBBS) degree from Dhaka University. After passing the final professional examination, there is a compulsory one-year internship. The internship is a prerequisite for obtaining registration from the BMDC to practice medicine. In October 2014, the Ministry of Health and Family Welfare capped admission and tuition fees at private medical colleges at 1,990,000 Bangladeshi taka (US$25,750 as of 2014) total for their five-year courses.

Admission for Bangladeshis to the MBBS programme at all medical colleges in Bangladesh (government and private) is conducted centrally by the Directorate General of Health Services (DGHS). It administers a written multiple choice question exam simultaneously throughout the country. Candidates are admitted based primarily on their score on this test, although grades at Secondary School Certificate (SSC) and Higher Secondary School Certificate (HSC) level also play a part. As of July 2014, the college is allowed to admit 65 students annually.

Bangladesh Journal of Medical Science, which is Scopus listed, is the official journal of the college. It is an open access journal, published quarterly. It accepts original research articles, review articles, interesting case reports, and short communications containing significant findings. Submissions should not have been published previously, and should not be submitted to multiple publications concurrently.

See also
 List of medical colleges in Bangladesh

References

External links 
 

Medical colleges in Bangladesh
Universities and colleges in Dhaka
Hospitals in Dhaka
Educational institutions established in 2005
2005 establishments in Bangladesh
Avicenna